Grudin is a surname, and may refer to:

 Jonathan Grudin, a Principal Researcher at Microsoft Research in human-computer interaction.
 Robert Grudin, an American writer and philosopher.